Ron Crippin (born 23 April 1947) is an Australian cricketer. He played nineteen first-class and five List A matches for New South Wales between 1970/71 and 1978/79.

See also
 List of New South Wales representative cricketers

References

External links
 

1947 births
Living people
Australian cricketers
New South Wales cricketers
Cricketers from Sydney